Tate Multimedia S.A. is a Polish video game publisher with titles on video game consoles, handheld game consoles and Windows. The company was established in 2002 and then it merged with Tate Interactive (formerly X-Ray Interactive) in 2015.

As of July 2022, Tate has transitioned from being a developer/publisher to a full-time publisher.

Notable games

References

External links

Company summary from GameSpot
Company summary from IGN
Tate Interactive Inc. (Canada) is a separate company based out of Ontario, Canada
 Penguin Kelvin

Companies based in Warsaw
Polish companies established in 2002
Video game companies established in 2002
Video game companies of Poland
Video game development companies
Video game publishers